Falków  is a village in the administrative district of Gmina Rachanie, within Tomaszów Lubelski County, Lublin Voivodeship, in eastern Poland.

The village has a population of 19.

References

Villages in Tomaszów Lubelski County